Goore is a surname. Notable people with the surname include:

Charles Goore (1701–1783), English merchant and politician
Dacosta Goore (born 1984), Ivorian footballer
Zeka Goore (born 1984), Ivorian footballer

See also
Gore (surname)